S64 may refer to:

Aviation 
 Blériot-SPAD S.64, a French biplane trainer
 Savoia-Marchetti S.64, an Italian endurance aircraft
 Sikorsky S-64 Skycrane, later the Erickson S-64 Aircrane, an American helicopter
 Stanford Airport, in Judith Basin County, Montana, United States

Other uses 
 S64 (Long Island bus)
 Dharug language
 S64: If swallowed, rinse mouth with water (only if the person is conscious), a safety phrase
 
 S64, a postcode district for Mexborough, England